This page is the discography for musician John Matarazzo. He has worked in music publishing and as a producer and composer.

Executive producer

Producer

Design/Realization

DJ mix

Technical

Composer

Notes

References

Production discographies